Tune In, Tokyo... is a live EP by the American punk rock band Green Day released exclusively in Japan in 2001. It was recorded during the tour of Warning in March 2001 in Japan.

Release and reception
Tune In, Tokyo... is the fourth live EP by Green Day and was released on October 9, 2001. It charted for 5 weeks in Japan, reaching as high as number 29 on the album chart. Track 7 can also be heard on the "Waiting" single.

Tune In, Tokyo... was released worldwide for the first time on November 28, 2014, as a part of Black Friday Record Store Day on translucent blue vinyl and was limited to a pressing of only 5,000. This pressing included an MP3 download of the album.

Charts

Track listing
Every track except for "King for a Day", which is on Nimrod, is on the album Warning.

Notes
Track 1 was recorded in Fukuoka, Japan on March 22, 2001.
Tracks 2, 3, 5, 6, 7 were recorded in Sendai, Japan on March 16, 2001.
Track 4 was recorded in Osaka, Japan on March 13, 2001.

Personnel
Band
 Billie Joe Armstrong – lead vocals, guitar
 Mike Dirnt – bass, backing vocals
 Tré Cool – drums

Additional Musicians
Jason White - Guitar
Gabrial McNair - Trumpet
Kurt Lohmiller - Saxophone

Production 
Kevin Lemoine - Engineer
Chris Bilheimer - Art Direction, Photography
Chris Lord-Alge - Mixing
Green Day - Producer

References

2001 EPs
2001 live albums
Green Day EPs
Reprise Records EPs
Live punk rock albums